Kārlis or Karlis is a given name. Notable people with the name include:

Kārlis Aperāts (1892–1944), Latvian Standartenführer in the Waffen SS during World War II
Kārlis Ašmanis (1898–1962), Latvian footballer
Kārlis Balodis (1864–1931), Latvian economist, financist, statistician and demographist
Kārlis Baumanis (1835–1905), better known as Baumaņu Kārlis, a Latvian composer
Kārlis Bētiņš (1867–1943), Latvian chess master and composer of studies
Kārlis Bone (1899–1941), Latvian footballer
Kārlis Būmeisters (born Riga), Latvian musician and politician
Karlis Ezergailis, Australian Motorcycle speedway rider
Kārlis Gailītis (1936–1992), Latvian Lutheran archbishop
Kārlis Goppers (1876–1941), Latvian military officer and the founder and President of Latvijas Skautu un Gaidu Centrālā Organizācija
Hugo Kārlis Grotuss (1884–1951), Latvian painter, classified as a Realist
Kārlis Irbītis (1904–1997), Latvian aeroplane designer
Kārlis Johansons (1890–1929), Latvian-Soviet avant-garde artist
Kārlis Lācis (born 1977), Latvian composer
Kārlis Leiškalns (born 1951), Latvian politician
Kārlis Lejnieks (born 1988), retired Latvian tennis player currently pursuing interest in coaching
Kārlis Kepke (1890–????), Latvian cyclist and Olympic competitor
Kārlis Klāsens (1895–1973), Latvian sailor and Olympic competitor
Kārlis Klāsups (1922–1991), Latvian chess master
Kārlis Kļava (1907–1941), Latvian sports shooter and Olympic competitor
Kārlis Lasmanis (born 1994), Latvian basketball player and Olympic competitor
Kārlis Lobe (1895–1985), Latvian Nazi collaborator and high-ranking Waffen-SS officer
Kārlis Mīlenbahs (1853–1916), the first native speaker of Latvian to devote his career to linguistics
Kārlis Mūsiņš (1919–1955), Latvian Untersturmführer in the Waffen-SS during WWII
Kārlis Muižnieks (born 1964), former basketball player, head coach of Barons LMT
Karlis Osis (1917–1997), Latvian-born American parapsychologist
Karlis Ozols (1912–2001), Latvian-Australian chess player
Kārlis Padegs (1911–1940), Latvian artist
Kārlis Paegle (1911–1997), Latvian ice hockey player
Kārlis Prauls (1895–1941), Latvian general, from 1930 to 1940 was a commander of Aizsargi organization
Kārlis Sensbergs, Waffen-Unterscharführer in the Waffen SS during World War II
Kārlis Skalbe (1879–1945), Latvian writer, poet, and activist
Kārlis Skrastiņš (born 1974), Latvian ice hockey player
Kārlis Smilga (born 1975), Latvian curler
Kārlis Šteins (1911–1983), Latvian and Soviet astronomer
Kārlis Tīls (1906–196?), Latvian international football defender and football manager
Kārlis Ulmanis (1877–1942), prominent Latvian politician in pre-World War II Latvia
Kārlis Vērdiņš (born 1979), Latvian poet
Kārlis Vilciņš (1892–1972), Latvian wrestler and Olympic competitor
Kārlis Zāle (1888–1942), Latvian sculptor
Kārlis Zariņš (1879–1963), Latvian diplomat
Kārlis Zariņš (1889–1978), Latvian writer
Kārlis Zilpaušs (1918–1944), Latvian ice hockey player
Kārlis Zirnis (born 1977), Latvian ice hockey player

See also

Karli (name)
Rich Karlis (born 1959), former American Football placekicker

Latvian masculine given names